The Communauté d'agglomération d'Épinal is an administrative association of communes in the Vosges department of eastern France. It was created on 1 January 2013 by the merger of the former Communauté d'agglomération d'Épinal-Golbey, Communauté de communes CAPAVENIR, Communauté de communes du Pays d'Olima et du Val d'Avière, Communauté de communes Est-Épinal Développement and 11 other communes. On 1 January 2017 it was expanded with the Communauté de communes du Val de Vôge, Communauté de communes de la Vôge vers les Rives de la Moselle, Communauté de communes de la Moyenne Moselle and 4 other communes. On 1 January 2018 it gained 2 communes from the Communauté de communes de Mirecourt Dompaire. It consists of 78 communes, and has its administrative offices at Golbey. Its area is 1118.4 km2. Its population was 111,259 in 2018, of which 32,223 in Épinal proper.

Composition
The communauté d'agglomération consists of the following 78 communes:

Arches
Archettes
Aydoilles
Badménil-aux-Bois
La Baffe
Bayecourt
Bellefontaine
Brantigny
Chamagne
Chantraine
La Chapelle-aux-Bois
Charmes
Charmois-l'Orgueilleux
Châtel-sur-Moselle
Chaumousey
Chavelot
Le Clerjus
Damas-aux-Bois
Darnieulles
Deyvillers
Dignonville
Dinozé
Dogneville
Domèvre-sur-Avière
Domèvre-sur-Durbion
Dompierre
Dounoux
Épinal
Essegney
Florémont
Fomerey
Fontenoy-le-Château
Les Forges
Frizon
Gigney
Girancourt
Golbey
Gruey-lès-Surance
Hadigny-les-Verrières
Hadol
Haillainville
La Haye
Hergugney
Igney
Jarménil
Jeuxey
Langley
Longchamp
Mazeley
Montmotier
Moriville
Nomexy
Padoux
Pallegney
Portieux
Pouxeux
Raon-aux-Bois
Rehaincourt
Renauvoid
Rugney
Sanchey
Savigny
Sercœur
Socourt
Thaon-les-Vosges
Trémonzey
Ubexy
Uriménil
Uxegney
Uzemain
Vaudéville
Vaxoncourt
Villoncourt
Vincey
La Vôge-les-Bains
Les Voivres
Xertigny
Zincourt

References

Epinal
Epinal